Fandi Eko Utomo (born 2 March 1991) is an Indonesian professional footballer who plays as a attacking midfielder.

Personal life
He is the son of former Indonesian international and Persebaya player, Yusuf Ekodono.

International goals
International U–23 goals

Honours

Clubs honors
Persebaya Surabaya
 Liga 1 runner-up: 2019
 Indonesia President's Cup runner-up: 2019
Persela U-21
 Indonesia Super League U-21: 2011

Individual honors
 Indonesia Super League U-21 Best Player: 2011

Country honors
Indonesia U-23
 Islamic Solidarity Games  Silver medal: 2013
 Southeast Asian Games  Silver medal: 2013

References

External links
 Fandi Eko Utomo at Soccerway
 Fandi Eko Utomo at Liga Indonesia

1991 births
Living people
People from Surabaya
Sportspeople from East Java
Sportspeople from Surabaya
Indonesian footballers
Association football midfielders
Liga 1 (Indonesia) players
Persela Lamongan players
Bhayangkara F.C. players
Madura United F.C. players
Persebaya Surabaya players
PSIS Semarang players
PSS Sleman players
Footballers at the 2014 Asian Games
Indonesia youth international footballers
Southeast Asian Games silver medalists for Indonesia
Southeast Asian Games medalists in football
Competitors at the 2013 Southeast Asian Games
Asian Games competitors for Indonesia